Maurice Mann (born September 14, 1982) is a former Canadian football wide receiver in the Canadian Football League. He was drafted by the Cincinnati Bengals in the fifth round of the 2004 NFL Draft. He played college football at Nevada and Monterey Peninsula College.

Mann has also been a member of the Cleveland Browns, Miami Dolphins, Seattle Seahawks, Minnesota Vikings, Edmonton Eskimos, Washington Redskins, Hamilton Tiger-Cats, and the Toronto Argonauts.

College career
He attended the University of Nevada and played in 20 games in his college career, catching 53 passes for 827 yards and five touchdowns.

External links
 CFL profile
 Toronto Argonauts bio 
 

1982 births
Living people
American football wide receivers
American players of Canadian football
Canadian football wide receivers
Cincinnati Bengals players
Cleveland Browns players
Edmonton Elks players
Hamilton Tiger-Cats players
Miami Dolphins players
Minnesota Vikings players
Nevada Wolf Pack football players
Seattle Seahawks players
Sportspeople from Santa Clara, California
Toronto Argonauts players
Washington Redskins players
Players of American football from California